Dr. Phillips High School is a public high school in Dr. Phillips, Florida, United States, near Orlando.

It serves the Dr. Phillips census-designated place (CDP), the Bay Hill CDP, and the residential portion of Lake Buena Vista.

History 
Dr. Phillips High School opened in fall of 1987 and was built for about 2,500 students in the Dr. Phillips area of southwest Orange County, Florida.

The school's first principal, Bill Spoone, went on to be elected to the Orange County School Board. The football stadium is named after him. The school's gymnasium is named after its second principal, Larry Payne, and is nicknamed "The House of Payne."

The school opened with enrollment above capacity and began using portable classrooms on the North Campus, formerly known as the 9th Grade Center. Due to overflow from main campus, many non-freshman classes were moved into additional portable classrooms at the 9th Grade Center, which was renamed North Campus, with the main campus renamed the South Campus. Portable classrooms are still used on the North Campus and are primarily for freshman-level classes.

As of the 2014–15 school year the school had 3,641 students, of whom 35% were white, 32% African American, 24% Hispanic, 7% Asian, and 2% multiracial.

The school underwent a series of renovations which finished in 2015. A new building has been added, along with new VPA classrooms on the South Campus.

Athletics 
The press box at Bill Spoone Stadium is dedicated to Mike Murray, "The Voice of the Panthers" since the school opened its doors in 1987. A full-time employee of a large aerospace contractor and not formally employed by the school, Murray was elected to their Athletic Hall of Fame in 2001.

The school's baseball facility is John Barbati Field. In 1992, the baseball facilities were completely renovated with a state of the art press box, team office and facilities. The new facilities were designed and constructed by William P. Riegert, CEO of Cox Associates, Architects, and donated to the OC School Board in a dedication ceremony on February 22, 1992. Accepting for the OC School Board were Assistant Superintendent Dave Wofford, Assistant Superintendent Dave Sojourner, Superintendent Don Shaw, Bill Spoone, and Bill Thompson. Today the Press Box is dedicated to Scott Muhlhann, a baseball player and 1992 school valedictorian who died of cancer in 1998.

The mascot for Dr. Phillips is the Panther; specifically, the Florida panther. They have many sports including lacrosse, football, baseball, golf, basketball and swimming. The Panthers have won FHSAA state championships in the following sports:
 Football (2017)
 Baseball (1996)
 Men's Basketball (2021)
 Women's Basketball (1992, 2011, 2012, 2013, 2022, 2023)
 Men's Golf (1990, 1991, 1997, 1999)
 Women's Golf (1993, 1994)
 Men's Swimming & Diving (1995)
 Women's Swimming & Diving (1994, 1995, 1996, 1997, 1998)
 Competitive Cheerleading (2009, 2010, 2011, 2012, 2013, 2020)
 Women's Flag Football (2011)

Athletic program accomplishments:
 FHSAA State All-Sports Award - 2012-13
 FHSAA State All-Sports Award - 2010-11
 FHSAA State All-Sports Award - 1998-99
 FHSAA State All-Sports Award - 1995-96

Notable alumni 

 Madison Anderson, model, Miss Universe 2019 runner up
 Darren Barnet, actor
 Wayne Brady, actor
 Mekia Cox, actress
 Ashley Eckstein, actress
 Joey Fatone, singer for the group *NSYNC
 Luis Fonsi, singer, Grammy award winner
 Eddie Huang, writer, director, restaurateur
 DJ Khaled, producer, DJ
 Matt Lauria, actor
 Vinicius Machado, actor
 Scooter Magruder, YouTube personality 
 Brit Marling, actress
 Bobby Olszewski, former member of the Florida House of Representatives, R-44
 Valery Ortiz, actress
 Rene Plasencia, Member of the Florida House of Representatives, R-50 
 Jean Rodríguez, Latin singer, songwriter, producer, and the brother of Luis Fonsi
 Michael James Scott, broadway actor
 Amanda Seales, actress
 Wesley Taylor, Broadway actor
 Hotboii, rapper*

Athletes

 Brian Barber, MLB player
 Braniff Bonaventure, Arena Football League player
 Ike Charlton, CFL player
 Ha Ha Clinton-Dix, NFL free safety 
 Johnny Damon, MLB outfielder, Dancing With The Stars contestant 
 Robert Damron, professional golfer
 Doug Gabriel, NFL and UFL  player
 Trey Griffey, NFL wide receiver
 Dee Hart, USA Today High School All-American (2010)
 Shane Larkin, NBA basketball player
 Kenny Layne, professional wrestler
 Oliver Marmol, MLB baseball manager
 Dan Miceli, MLB pitcher
 Matt Milano, NFL linebacker
 Marcell Harris, NFL safety
 A. J. Pierzynski, MLB catcher
 Kona Reeves, professional wrestler
 Mark Ruiz, member of US Olympic diving team at 2000 and 2004 Summer Olympics
 Kenny Shaw, professional football player
 Ty Tryon, professional golfer
 Chris Warren, basketball player
 Damien Wilkins, NBA basketball player
 Ray Willis, basketball player

References

External links 

 Official site

Educational institutions established in 1987
Orange County Public Schools
Magnet schools in Florida
Schools of the performing arts in the United States
High schools in Orange County, Florida
Schools in Orlando, Florida
Public high schools in Florida
1987 establishments in Florida